Dejan Djokic (born 26 September 2000) is a Swiss professional footballer who plays as a forward for Swiss Challenge League club Vaduz.

Club career
Djokic is a youth product of Vaduz, and signed his first professional contract with them in 2020. He helped the club get promoted into the Swiss Super League for the 2020-21 season. He made his professional debut with Vaduz in a 1–0 Swiss Super League loss to FC St. Gallen on 27 September 2020.

Career statistics

Club

Personal life
Born in Switzerland, Djokic is of Bosnian descent.

References

External links
 
 SFL Profile

2000 births
Living people
People from Walenstadt
Swiss men's footballers
Swiss people of Bosnia and Herzegovina descent
FC Vaduz players
Swiss expatriate sportspeople in Liechtenstein
Swiss Super League players
Swiss Challenge League players
Association football forwards
Swiss expatriate footballers
Swiss expatriates in Liechtenstein
Expatriate footballers in Liechtenstein
Sportspeople from the canton of St. Gallen